Bhagwant  may refer to 

 Bhagwant Das, ruler of Amber
 Bhagwant Mann, Indian politician and actor
 Bhagwant Nagar, a town in the Unnao district in the state of Uttar Pradesh
 Bhagwant Singh, Jat ruler of Dholpur state
 Bhagwant Singh of Mewar, the titular ruler of the Indian princely state of Udaipur or Mewar 
 Bhagwant University, located in Ajmer, Rajasthan, India

Hindu given names
Indian masculine  given names